Deva may refer to:

Entertainment
 Deva (1989 film), a 1989 Kannada film
 Deva (1995 film), a 1995 Tamil film
 Deva (2002 film), a 2002 Bengali film
 Deva (2007 Telugu film)
 Deva (2017 film), a 2017 Marathi film
 Deva (Dungeons & Dragons), a type of angel
 Devas, characters in Digimon Tamers

People

Given name
 Deva (composer) (born 1950), Indian film composer and singer
 Дeva (Deva) (born 2000), Hungarian singer-songwriter
 Deva Bandhumasena (1891–1944), Thai military officer
 Deva Katta, Indian-born American citizen filmmaker
 Deva Mahal, soul and R&B singer in New York
 Deva Mahenra (born 1990), actor, model and presenter from Indonesia
 Deva Premal (born 1970), German musician
 Deva Raya II (died 1446), emperor of the Vijayanagara Empire
 Santos Souza Delvanita (commonly known as Deva; born 1989), Brazilian footballer

Surname
 A. N. Prabhu Deva, Indian academic
 Bhattakalanka Deva (fl. 1604), Kannada grammarian
 Deva Dassy (1911–2016), French mezzo-soprano
 Girvan Yuddha Bikram Shah (1797–1816), King of Nepal
 Mukul Deva (born 1961), Indian English author
 Narendra Deva (1889–1956), Indian politician
 Nirj Deva (born 1948), United Kingdom politician
 Prabhu Deva (born 1973), South Indian actor, dancer, and movie director
 Ramachandra Deva (1948–2013), Indian Kannada poet, writer and playwright
 Saara Deva (born 1994), Indian actress who predominantly appears in Tamil cinema
 Sarah Jezebel Deva or Sarah Jane Ferridge (born 1977), British vocalist 
 Srikanth Deva (born 1980), Indian music director
 Terra Deva, American musician
 Vishnu Deva (born 1975), Indian choreographer
 Xhafer Deva (1904–1978), Albanian politician

Religion
 Deva (Hinduism), a divine being or god in Hinduism
 Deva (Buddhism), a higher being in Buddhism
 Deva (Jainism), a term used for heavenly beings in Jainism
 Daeva, a malevolent god or supernatural entity in Zoroastrianism 
 Deva (New Age), spiritual forces or beings behind nature
 Deva people of Sri Lankan mythology

Rivers
 Deva (river), a river in Northern Spain, between Asturias and Cantabria
 River Dee, Aberdeenshire, in Aberdeenshire, Scotland
 River Dee, Galloway, in southwest Scotland
 River Dee, Wales, a river in the United Kingdom

Towns
 Deva, Gijón, a parish of Gijón, in Asturias, Spain
 Deva, Romania, a city in Hunedoara county, Romania
 Deva Victrix, a Roman fortress and town, now Chester, England
 Deva Village, India

Other uses
 DEVA, abbreviation for Deutsche Versuchs- und Prüfanstalt für Jagd- und Sportwaffen
 DEVA, abbreviation for Demokrasi ve Atılım Partisi, Democracy and Progress Party of Turkey
 Deva (moth), a synonym of the moth genus Plusiodonta of the family Erebidae
 Deva dynasty (c. 12th–13th century), Hindu dynasty of Bengal
 Deva dynasty (Saketa)
 Deva Stadium, a football stadium in Chester named after the city's Roman name
 CA Deva, football club in Cantabria, Spain
 DeVa, or Demokraattinen Vaihtoehto, Democratic Alternative a Finnish Communist party
 ISO 15924 code for Devanagari, script

See also
 Angelic (disambiguation)
 Anito
 Apsara
 Asura
 Bhagavan
 Daeva
 Deba (disambiguation)
 Dev (disambiguation)
 Devas (disambiguation)
 Devic (disambiguation)
 Dewa (disambiguation)
 Dewi (disambiguation)
 Diva (disambiguation)
 Divinity
 Gandharva
 God and gender in Hinduism
 Hindu deities
 Ishvara
 Visvedevas